State Route 146 (SR 146) is a  major east–west state highway in the southern part of the U.S. state of Nevada. It begins at the exit 27 interchange on Interstate 15 (I-15) south of the Las Vegas Strip and ends at the Pecos Road (exit 6) interchange on I-215 in Henderson. The highway is currently known as Saint Rose Parkway, but was known as Lake Mead Drive prior to 2001.

History

The original segment of SR 146 was known as State Route 41 (Lake Mead Drive) until the early-1980s. Originally, it was a  route that began at the current western terminus at Interstate 15 and crossed Boulder Highway in Henderson before ending at the intersection of North Shore Road near Lake Mead.

Construction of I-215 through southeast Las Vegas and Henderson altered the routing of SR 146. Clark County decided to build I-215 between Mile 6 (St. Rose Parkway/Pecos Road) and Mile 0 (the Interstate 515/U.S. Route 93/U.S. Route 95 interchange) on the SR 146 alignment. Since the Nevada Department of Transportation (NDOT) does not co-sign state routes along Interstate highways, the decision was made in 1999 to officially truncate SR 146 to its current eastern terminus. The portion of the highway east of I-515/US 93/US 95 was recommissioned as State Route 564 (and has since been renamed Lake Mead Parkway). Clark County posted SR 146 signs along the  overlapping section of I-215, even though the state highway designation no longer existed in this section when the freeway was completed in 2001—Many SR 146 signs still remained on I-215 in 2007, but have since been removed.

Major intersections

See also

References

146
Streets in Henderson, Nevada
Transportation in Clark County, Nevada
Enterprise, Nevada
Transportation in the Las Vegas Valley